Perrotin is a contemporary art gallery founded in 1990 by Emmanuel Perrotin, at the age of twenty-one. He has since opened over eighteen spaces, with the aim of offering increasingly vibrant and creative environments in which to experience art. He has worked closely with his roster of artists, some for more than twenty-five years, to help fulfill their ambitious projects. 

Perrotin has galleries in Paris, Hong Kong, New York, Seoul, Tokyo, Shanghai and Las Vegas, totaling approximately 7,000 square meters (75,000 square feet) of exhibition space across its various locations.

The gallery has expanded its mission in recent years, most notably through the production of thoughtful editorial content, such as podcast and video, as well as developing a programmatic calendar, which includes panel discussions, education workshops for children, and concerts. The gallery also publishes catalogues, editions, and goodies, available in its bookstores.

Today, Perrotin represents 56 artists, and has collaborated with musicians such as Feist, Massive Attack, N.E.R.D., Pharrell Williams, and many others.

History 
Since 2005, Perrotin's Paris gallery has been located in an eighteenth-century mansion, with three gallery spaces totaling approximately 1,600 square meters (17,000 sq. ft.) in the Marais district of Paris. In 2014, Perrotin opened a 700-square-meter (7,500 sq. ft.) showroom on the same street as the main gallery space, known as “La Salle de Bal,” in a former ballroom in the Hôtel d’Ecquevilly, in Paris. 
In spring 2020, Perrotin opens a space totaling 70 square meters (750 sq. ft.) on Avenue Matignon in the west of Paris. In their entirety, the Parisian spaces amount to 2,370 square meters (25,500 sq. ft.) 

In May 2012, Perrotin opened its Hong Kong gallery at  50 Connaught Road Central, designed by architect Andre Fu, totaling 650 square meters / approx. 7,000 square feet.
Perrotin announced in 2020 that the Hong Kong gallery will move across the harbor to K11 ATELIER Victoria Dockside on the Tsim Sha Tsui waterfront. 

From 2013 to 2016, Perrotin New York was housed in a historic building on the Upper East Side’s iconic Madison Avenue.  After three successful years in Perrotin New York's Upper East Side location, the gallery expanded in April 2017 to a 2,300-square-meter (25,000 sq. ft.) space, relocating to 130 Orchard Street in New York City. 

In 2016, Perrotin inaugurated a 240-square-meter (2,600 sq. ft.) space in Seoul.

Additionally, in June 2017, Perrotin opened a space in Tokyo, occupying 130 square meters (1,400 sq. ft.) Après des travaux d’agrandissement en 2019, la galerie se déploie sur 230 m².

In 2018, Perrotin launched a gallery in Shanghai, in the heart of the city's Bund quarter. 

In 2022, Perrotin opened a store at the Bellagio Resort and Casino in Las Vegas which sells prints, editions, publications and artist-designed objects.

Artists 

Represented Artists
Iván Argote, Daniel Arsham, Hernan Bas, Genesis Belanger, Sophie Calle, Maurizio Cattelan, Chen Fei, Chung Chang-Sup, Johan Creten, Gabriel de la Mora, Wim Delvoye, Elmgreen & Dragset, Ericson & Ziegler, Erró, Lionel Estéve, Jens Fange, Bernard Frize, Gelitin, Laurent Grasso, Zach Harris, Hans Hartung, Thilo Heinzmann, John Henderson, Leslie Hewitt, Gregor Hildebrandt, JR, Jesper Just, Izumi Kato, Bharti Kher, Klara Kristalova, Julio Le Parc, Lee Bae, MADSAKI, Georges Mathieu, Barry McGee, Farhad Moshiri, Gianni Motti, Mr., Takashi Murakami, Ni Youyu, Jean-Michel Othoniel, Park Seo-Bo, Paul Pfeiffer, Paola Pivi, Gabriel Rico, Claude Rutault, Michael Sailstorfer, Emily Mae Smith, Jesús Rafael Soto, Pierre Soulages, Josh Sperling, Claire Tabouret, Aya Takano, Xavier Veilhan, Pieter Vermeersch, Xu Zhen®

Projects With
gimhongsok, Jean-Philippe Delhomme, KAWS, Kim Chong-Hak, Lee Seung-jio, Lee Mingwei, Sol LeWitt, Eddie Martinez, Otani Workshop, GaHee Park, Terry Richardson, Matthew Ronay, Mark Ryden, Cinga Samson, Maria Taniguchi, Tatiana Trouvé, Artie Vierkant

Art fairs 
Perrotin participates in twenty major international art fairs each year, including Art Basel in Basel, Miami, and Hong Kong; Frieze Art Fair in London and New York; FIAC, Paris; the Dallas Art Fair; Art Cologne; Untitled, Art, San Francisco; Art Stage Jakarta; Expo Chicago; Independent New York; TEFAF New York and Maastricht; ART021 Shanghai; West Bund Art & Design, Shanghai; Art Fair Tokyo; and Zona Maco, Mexico.

References

Art galleries established in 1990
Contemporary art galleries in France
Contemporary art galleries in the United States